Mt. Healthy Public School is a registered historic building in Mt. Healthy, Ohio, listed in the National Register on May 2, 1985.  The building is located at the corner of Compton Rd. and Harrison Ave.  It opened in 1911 and was closed by the Mt Healthy City Schools in the 1980s.  The building then underwent a series of acquisitions, and is currently used as the Mt. Healthy Preparatory and Fitness Academy.

See also 
School buildings on the National Register of Historic Places in Ohio

Images

Notes 

Buildings and structures in Hamilton County, Ohio
School buildings on the National Register of Historic Places in Ohio
National Register of Historic Places in Hamilton County, Ohio